Ultimate Love Season 1 was the debut season of the Nigerian reality competition series, Ultimate Love. It premiered on 9 February 2020 on DStv channel 198. Dakore Egbuson-Akande and Oluwaseun Olaniyan were the hosts. The ultimate prize is finding love and if the Ultimate Couple decides to get married, they will win a lavish all-expenses-paid wedding and a fully furnished home. The winning couple of ultimate love season 1 reality show will also get a cash prize of N5million after being married for a year.

Ultimate Love was expected to run for 60 days, but was cut short and ran for 50 days, due to the COVID-19 pandemic.

On 29 March 2020, Roksie, the duo of Rosie and Kachi became the winners of the show, after polling the highest number of votes. Iykeresa (Iyke and Theresa) and Bolar (Bolanle and Arnold) were the runner-up love guests of the show.

Kachi later proposed to Rosie on the show during their discussion with the hosts before the end of the program on 29 March. Rosie said yes.

Housemates 

The premiere night is marked as Day 0. The day after is Day 1.
Initially, the contest was to last for 60 days, however due to the COVID-19 pandemic, Multichoice announced the season will end on the 29th of March 2020.

Marriages 
Chris Adah and Chris Obaoye (Double Chris) earlier held  their wedding on Saturday, December 26 2020.

References

External links 
 Official site

2020 Nigerian television seasons